The O'Day 23 is a series of American trailerable sailboats, that were designed by C. Raymond Hunt Assoc. and first built in 1972.

Production
The boat series was built by O'Day Corporation in the United States and the 23-2 was also built by Mariner Construções Náuticas Ltd in Brazil, but all are now out of production.

Design
The O'Day 23 is a small recreational keelboat, built predominantly of fiberglass, with wood trim. It has a masthead sloop rig, a transom-hung rudder and a folding centerboard keel. The boats are normally fitted with outboard motors.

When it was introduced the O'Day 23-1 model incorporated a unique and controversial pop-up "Lift Top", whereby the entire coachhouse roof could be raised on lift struts above the deck. The mast is keel stepped and the roof slides up on the mast, which does not move.  On later 23-1s the lift top was reduced in size, called a "Convertible Top" and just lifts the area behind the mast. When the 23-2 was introduced in 1978 it was of a more conventional design and eliminated this feature entirely.

Variants
O'Day 23-1
This model was introduced in 1972, with 500 examples completed. It has the pop-up "Lift Top" or later "Convertible Top". The boat is normally fitted with a small  outboard motor for docking and maneuvering. The design has sleeping accommodation for five people, with a double "V"-berth in the bow cabin, a drop-down dinette table that converts to a double berth and an aft quarter berth on the port side. The galley is located on the port side just forward of the companionway ladder. The galley is equipped with a two-burner stove, ice box and a sink. The head is located in the bow cabin on the starboard side.
O'Day 23-2
This model was introduced in 1978 and built until 1984, with 1000 examples completed by O'Day in the US and Mariner Construções Náuticas Ltd in Brazil. The boat is normally fitted with a small  outboard motor or an optional inboard motor for docking and maneuvering. The design has sleeping accommodation for five people, with a double "V"-berth in the bow cabin, a drop-down  dinette table that converts to a double berth and a single settee berth on the starboard side. The galley is located on both sides of the companionway ladder, with a two-burner stove to port and a sink to starboard. The cockpit has an ice box on the starboard side. The head is located in the bow cabin on the port side.

Operational history
In a 2010 review of the O'Day 23-1 Steve Henkel wrote, "This vessel was produced in several versions—two types of poptops and a solid top—over five years, 1970 to 1974. A Mk II version ... with no poptop (and other differences) followed in 1977. In the Mk I version, one of the poptop designs was a 'convertible,' that is, the whole cabin trunk roof lifted on struts (see phantom view). However, there were problems with sealing out rain and spray in the joint between cabin trunk and deck, and the through-the-deck mast. Consequently, the design was dropped in favor of an alternative poptop in which only the aft section lifted. This allowed the mast to be stepped in a tabernacle on the cabintop, making mast setup at a launching ramp much easier ... No significant negative features were noted by us, other than the 'convertible' poptop idea."

In a 2010 review of the O'Day 23-2 Steve Henkel wrote, "The O’Day 23 Mk II (22) follows a series of 21-, 22 
and 23-footers by C. Raymond Hunt Associates and various other designers, all targeted at the same market ... Until the O'Day company ceased operations in 1989, they were a potent force in the small sailboat market in the eastern U.S,, particularly in the 21- to 23-foot size range, of which this design is representative. Best features: Compared to her comp[etitor]s, which are all heavy centerboarders, the O'Day 23 Mk II ... has the highest (that is, best) Space Index and the lowest minimum draft, is tied for the greatest headroom and the lowest average PHRF, and has the heaviest construction (calculated by subtracting ballast from displacement). Worst features: The mainsheet traveler, led to a bridle attached to the split backstay, is not one of our favorite rigging arrangements, as the helmsman has to look aft to find the mainsheet bitter end, undesirable when racing tight quarters."

See also
List of sailing boat types

Similar sailboats
Beneteau First 235
Bluenose one-design sloop
Hunter 23
Paceship 23
Paceship PY 23
Precision 23
Rob Roy 23
Schock 23
Sonic 23
Starwind 223
Stone Horse
Watkins 23

References

External links

Keelboats
1970s sailboat type designs
Sailing yachts
Trailer sailers
Sailboat type designs by C. Raymond Hunt Associates
Sailboat types built by O'Day Corp.